Romanzo Norton Bunn (September 24, 1829 – January 25, 1909) was an American lawyer and judge.  He was a United States district judge of the Western District of Wisconsin, a Wisconsin Circuit Court Judge, and a member of the Wisconsin State Assembly.

Education and career

Born in South Hartwick, New York, Bunn read law to enter the bar in 1853. He was in private practice in Ellicottville, New York, from 1853 to 1854, and then in Galesville, Wisconsin, until 1861. He was district attorney in Galesville from 1857 to 1858. He was a Republican member of the Wisconsin State Assembly in 1859, returning to private practice in Sparta, Wisconsin, from 1861 to 1868. He was a Judge of the Wisconsin Circuit Court for the 6th Judicial Circuit from 1868 to 1877. He was a Professor of law at the University of Wisconsin from 1878 to 1885.

Federal judicial service

On October 25, 1877, Bunn was nominated by President Rutherford B. Hayes to a seat on the United States District Court for the Western District of Wisconsin vacated by Judge James C. Hopkins. Bunn was confirmed by the United States Senate on October 30, 1877, and received his commission the same day. Bunn served in that capacity until his retirement on January 9, 1905.

Death

Bunn died on January 25, 1909, in Madison, Wisconsin. His former home there is located in what is now the Langdon Street Historic District.

References

Sources
 

1829 births
1909 deaths
People from Hartwick, New York
Judges of the United States District Court for the Western District of Wisconsin
Republican Party members of the Wisconsin State Assembly
United States federal judges appointed by Rutherford B. Hayes
19th-century American judges
New York (state) lawyers
Wisconsin state court judges
University of Wisconsin Law School faculty
People from Galesville, Wisconsin
District attorneys in Wisconsin